The long-toed forest skink (Sphenomorphus anomalopus)  is a species of skink found in Malaysia and Indonesia.

References

anomalopus
Reptiles described in 1890
Taxa named by George Albert Boulenger
Reptiles of the Malay Peninsula
Fauna of Sumatra